Bachata Nation is the fifth studio album by The Bronx born Bachata artist Toby Love released in 2016 through Top Stop Music. This album included 4 singles that reached the top of the Billboard Tropical Airplay chart. The song "El Aire Que Respiro" peaked at #8 while the songs "We Never Looking Back" featuring French Montana, "Vestida De Blanco", and "No Le Eches La Culpa" peaked at #1.

Track listing

Charts

References

Toby Love albums
2016 albums
Spanish-language albums